The Georgia Bulldogs are the athletic teams that represent the University of Georgia. The female athletic teams are sometimes referred to as Lady Bulldogs. The Bulldogs compete in NCAA Division I and are members of the Southeastern Conference (SEC). The official mascot is an English Bulldog named Uga, (derived from an abbreviation of the University of Georgia), while the costumed character version of Uga is Hairy Dawg.

The university sponsors nineteen sports – baseball, men's and women's basketball, men's and women's cross country, women's equestrian, football, men's and women's golf, women's gymnastics, women's soccer, softball, men's and women's swimming and diving, men's and women's tennis, men's and women's track, and women's volleyball. Those 19 teams have won a combined 48 national championships (including 31 NCAA championships) and 173 Southeastern Conference championships (plus 264 individual national championships through the end of the 2013–14 school year). University students have also won 56 Olympic medals.
In 2006, the Bulldogs recorded the highest profit margin of any athletic program in the country (according to the EADA report), pulling in $23.9 million.

Nickname and mascot

The first mention of "Bulldogs" in association with Georgia athletics occurred on November 28, 1901, at the Georgia-Auburn football game played in Atlanta. The Georgia fans "had a badge saying 'Eat'em Georgia' and a picture of a bulldog tearing a piece of cloth"; however, it was not until 1920 that the nickname "Bulldog" was used to describe the athletic teams at the University of Georgia. Traditionally, the choice of a Bulldog as the UGA mascot was attributed to the alma mater of its founders and first president, who graduated from Yale University. On November 3, 1920, Morgan Blake, a sportswriter for the Atlanta Journal wrote a story about school nicknames for football teams and proposed:

"The Georgia Bulldogs would sound good because there is a certain dignity about a bulldog, as well as ferocity."

Shortly thereafter, another news story appeared in the Atlanta Constitution in which the name "Bulldogs" was used several times to describe the Georgia football team, and the nickname has been used ever since then.

Sports sponsored

Baseball

The Bulldogs play in the 3,291-seat Foley Field stadium.

The Georgia Baseball team has seen most of its success in recent years, including winning the 1990 College World Series, as well as making the trip to Omaha in 1987, 1990, 2001, 2004, 2006, and 2008. The Diamond Dawgs, as they are called, are coached by Scott Stricklin.

In its history, the team has claimed five Southeastern Conference tournament titles, in 1933, 1954, 1955, 2001, and 2004, and five regular season conference titles, in 1933, 1953, 1954, 2004, and 2008.

The program dates back to 1886 and, according to former Sports Information Director Dan Magill, was once the most popular sport on campus. However, from the mid-1950s to the late-1980s, and then through most of the 1990s, there were only scattered bright spots as the team managed only a modicum of success.

Since 2001, however, the program has enjoyed a resurgence, winning three championships in the Southeastern Conference, and participating in the College World Series four times in those seven seasons.

The Georgia-Georgia Tech baseball rivalry is one of the South's most fierce. The teams' annual Spring Baseball Classic at Turner Field draws some of the largest crowds in college baseball (the 2004 game was seen by 28,836 spectators, the second-largest crowd in college baseball history).

Basketball

Women's basketball

Coach Andy Landers, a pioneer in the sport, coached the Lady Bulldogs from 1979 to 2015, leading them to seven regular-season SEC titles, four SEC tournament championships, twenty 21-win seasons (an average of 24.4 wins per season), 23 NCAA tournaments, and five Final Fours. Landers currently stands as the winningest women's college basketball coach not to have won the national championship. The Lady Dogs' all-time AP ranking stands at 4th .

Men's basketball

Georgia's men's basketball program has enjoyed several impressive seasons, including a run to the 2008 SEC Championship and berth in the NCAA tournament under former head coach Dennis Felton.

While Dominique Wilkins is considered the greatest player in school history, the team's most successful season came one year after his graduation. The Bulldogs made their first NCAA appearance in 1983 – which would have been Wilkins' senior year had he not opted for the NBA. That team advanced to the Final Four before falling to eventual national champion NC State. Under the Tom Crean regime, the Bulldogs landed the number one recruit in the country in Anthony Edwards in 2018, the highest rated recruit in school history. Edwards would go on to be selected first in the 2020 NBA Draft by the Minnesota Timberwolves, the first Georgia basketball player to do so.

Since making its first postseason tournament in 1980, Georgia has received 21 postseason invitations under coaches Hugh Durham, Tubby Smith, Ron Jirsa, Jim Harrick, and Dennis Felton, including 10 trips to the NCAA tournament.

Equestrian
Equestrian was added as UGA's 21st intercollegiate varsity sport in 2001. UGA's newest varsity team first competed in the 2002–2003 season. Head coach Meghan Boenig
guided the team to a national championship in the Varsity Equestrian National Championships (NCEA) that year as well as a repeat national championship the following year (2003–2004). After a series of runner-up finishes, the team reclaimed the top spot in 2007–2008 and repeated as champions in 2008–2009 and 2009–2010. They also earned the 2014 and 2021 national championship titles.

The University of Georgia consistently ranks number 1 in the nation for recruits per National Collegiate Equestrian Association's Coaches' poll.

In January 2009, Georgia riders moved into their spacious new home, the UGA Equestrian Complex, located in Bishop, Georgia. The site is approximately 12 miles south of the Athens, Georgia campus. The 109-acre farm was formerly used in the 1996 Summer Olympics as a training site for the U.S. Dressage Team. The team originally trained and held meets at the Animal Science Arena on South Milledge Avenue. The Animal Science Arena is maintained by University of Georgia's College of Agricultural and Environmental Sciences (CAES). As the academic programs grew at CAES, the team relocated to the UGA Equestrian Complex.

Football

The 92,746 seat Dooley Field at Sanford Stadium is the home of the Georgia football team. The white, and now also brown Bulldog is UGA's mascot and is properly known as the late "Uga VIII", now "Uga X", previously known as "Que". The Bulldogs play in the tradition-rich Southeastern Conference.

The Bulldogs claim four football national championships: one for the 1942 seasons based on the determinations of several selecting organizations, and three consensus national championships for the 1980, 2021, and 2022 seasons based on the votes of the AP and Coaches Polls (several selectors have recognized the Bulldogs as national champions for the 1927, 1946, and 1968 seasons as well). Georgia has won 14 Southeastern Conference (SEC) championships (the most recent coming in 2022).

Georgia owns the nations longest active bowl streak at 26, surpassing the previous leader Virginia Tech, who reeled off 27 in a row. The bulldogs are 20-6 in that stretch, excluding the three CFP National Championship games in 2018, 2022, and 2023. In that time period; Georgia has accumulated 3 Peach Bowl victories, 3 Sugar Bowl victories, and a CFP Semi-Final Rose Bowl win to send them to the 2018 CFP National Championship game. Georgia's brand has grown exponentially under coach Kirby Smart, who's pieced together three #1 recruiting classes in his five seasons as Head Coach and led the Bulldogs to the 2021 National Championship victory over Nick Saban's Alabama Crimson Tide team 33-18. The next year, the Bulldogs also won the National Champion over Sonny Dykes' TCU Horned Frogs team 65-7.

Rivalries
The Bulldogs' most historic rivalry is with the Auburn Tigers, referred to as the Deep South's Oldest Rivalry and dating back to 1892. The other rivalries are between the Bulldogs and the Atlantic Coast Conference's Georgia Tech Yellow Jackets ("Clean, Old-Fashioned Hate") and the Florida Gators ("World's Largest Outdoor Cocktail Party"). In addition, UGA enjoyed a strong rivalry with the nearby Clemson Tigers for many years in football, especially in the 1980s. The Bulldogs and the Tennessee Volunteers annual showdown on the second Saturday of October has become a rivalry as a result of the 1992 division of the Southeastern Conference into Eastern and Western divisions. Before 1992, the two teams had only met 21 times since 1899. Beginning in 1992, the two teams have played annually as members of the same division. Georgia also enjoys a healthy rivalry with the South Carolina Gamecocks, meeting on the football field 70 times since 1894.

The Georgia-Florida game is held annually in late October/early November in Jacksonville, Florida, a site intended to be neutral. However, the game's location is a point of contention for many Georgia fans; many of whom argue that Jacksonville's location relative to the two universities favors Florida. The city lies 342 miles from Athens, Georgia, home of the Bulldogs, but only 73 miles from Gainesville, Florida, home of the Gators. The game is considered a must-do for many UGA students and alumni. The game was traditionally referred to as the "World's Largest Outdoor Cocktail Party" due to the tailgating and celebration by fans, but in recent years the city and universities have dropped the usage to discourage drunkenness among fans. However, fans and former players on both sides of the rivalry still refer to it by that name, or a shortened "Cocktail Party," choosing not to ever use the sanitized "official" name. Georgia holds the all-time advantage in the series, posting a win–loss record of 54–44–2 (53–44–2 according to the University of Florida, which does not include the 1904 game in Macon, Georgia, played before officially sanctioning its football program). The University of Florida closed what was a substantial gap in the series by posting a better overall record in the 1990s and 2000s. Georgia turned the tables in the 2010s, winning 6 of 10, and Georgia leads the series since 2020, winning the last two games. The most recent game in the rivalry was a 42-20 Bulldogs win

Golf

Men's golf
From 1946 to 1970, Howell Hollis built the Georgia men's golf team into a conference power, claiming 13 SEC titles. George Hamer won the individual national title in 1946. Current coach Chris Haack has led the team to two golf national titles (1999, 2005).

Overall, the men's golf team leads all Georgia sports with 29 conference championships, including seven since 2000 (1941, 1950–52, 1957–59, 1961–65, 1969–72, 1977–78, 1982–83, 1988, 1998, 2000–01, 2004, 2006, 2009–10, 2016).

Notable alumni include two-time Masters' champion Bubba Watson, as well as the winner of the 2019 WGC-Dell Technologies Match Play, Kevin Kisner.

Women's golf
First organized by Liz Murphey, the Georgia women's golf team is a fixture among the nation's top finishers. In 1981 Terri Moody won the AIAW individual national intercollegiate golf championship on her home course.

Todd McCorkle coached the Georgia women's golf team from 2001 to 2007, when he abruptly resigned before the NCAA Women's Golf Championship under a cloud of sexual harassment allegations. His inaugural UGA team won the national championship. UGA's sixth place tie at the 2006 national event marks the seventh top-10 final ranking in the last nine years. The program has won eleven SEC titles. Former players include Vicki Goetze, now on the LPGA Tour.

Women's gymnastics

Since 1986, the Gymdogs have brought home 10 gymnastics national championships (1987, '89, 1993, '98, '99, 2005, '06, '07, '08, '09), the most of any team in NCAA history. (while Utah has also won ten national titles, their first was an AIAW Championship in 1981). Georgia is also only the second team (Utah, 1982–86) to win the national title in five consecutive years, winning in 2005–2009. The Gymdogs have won 16 Southeastern Conference titles.

The Gymdogs consistently draw upwards of 10,000 fans to their meets, ranking them second only to football in average attendance among Georgia sports.

No Bulldog team has dominated its sport as much in the past 20 years as the Georgia Gymdogs, under the direction of Suzanne Yoculan.
On October 18, 2007, Yoculan announced her retirement after the 2009 season. Longtime assistant Jay Clark succeeded Yoculan as head coach from 2009-2012.
Danna Durante served as head coach from 2012-2017.
In 2017 former Gymdog Courtney Kupets-Carter became the head coach and Suzanne Yoculan became a volunteer assistant coach for the transition period.

Women's soccer

Turner Soccer Complex

Women's swimming and diving

UGA Alum and Coach Jack Bauerle has placed the women's program among the nation's elite. As of the 2016 season the women's team is tied with the University of Texas for the second highest number of national championships at seven (1999, 2000, '01, '05, '13, '14, '16) and posted eight national runner-up finishes (2002, '03, '04, '06, '09, '11, '12, '15). The Lady Bulldogs have also brought home twelve SEC team championships (1997, '98, '99, 2000, '01, '06, '10, '11, '12, '13, '14, '15). Bauerle has coached 11 female Olympians and 88 SEC individual champions. Graduates of the Georgia Swimming and Diving program include three individual recipients of the NCAA Woman of the Year Award: Lisa Coole in 1997, Kristy Kowal in 2000 and Kim Black in 2001.

Softball

The Bulldog softball team began play in 1997. The team has won two SEC regular season championships in 2003 and 2005. The Team won the SEC tournament in 2014. The team has made eighteen NCAA tournament appearances. The team has made four Women's College World Series appearances in 2009, 2010, 2016, 2018, and 2021. The current head coach is Lu Harris-Champer.

Tennis

Men's tennis
Under the direction of Dan Magill from 1954 to 1988 and his successor (and current head coach) Manuel Diaz, the Georgia Men's Tennis program ranks among the nation's best. The team has won a total of eight tennis national championships in 1985, '87, '99, 2001, '06 (indoor), 07 (indoor and NCAA Division I), and 2008. The Bulldogs' six NCAA team championships rank fourth all-time. The 2007 indoor championship made Georgia only the sixth team in history to successfully defend the ITA Indoor title. Coach Manuel Diaz is the only NCAA Division I active coach with more than one NCAA team Championships, with four.

The squad has won 32 Southeastern Conference championships, 25 regular season championships and seven SEC tournament championships.

The NCAA Men's Tennis Championship has been held in Athens 24 times in the past 35 years, including consecutively from 1977 to 1989 and in 2007. All but one (2008) of UGA's NCAA team championships have been won in Athens.

Women's tennis
UGA alum Jeff Wallace has coached the Georgia Women's Tennis program since 1985, and is currently the winningest active NCAA women's tennis coach. His teams have won two NCAA team championships (1994 and 2000), three ITA Indoor Championships (1994, 1995 and 2002) and nine SEC titles. Coach Walace's players have also won several individual NCAA titles. The NCAA Women's Tennis Championship has been held in Athens 3 times.

Track & field and cross country

Men's track & field
Notable UGA men's track and field athletes include Olympic gold medalist Forrest Towns and bronze medalist Reese Hoffa.

UGA coach Petros Kyprianou guided the UGA men's track and field team to the 2018 NCAA men's Division I Outdoor Track and Field Championship title.

Men's cross country
Notable UGA men's cross country athletes include World Marathon Champion Mark Plaatjes.

Women's track & field

UGA coach Petros Kyprianou guided the UGA women's track and field team to the 2018 NCAA Women's Division I Indoor Track and Field Championship.

Notable UGA women's track and field athletes include Olympic gold medalists Gwen Torrence and Shaunae Miller-Uibo, silver medalist Hyleas Fountain, and bronze medalist Debbie Ferguson.

Other sports
Other notable sports teams include the perennial power men's swimming team. Notable track and field athletes include Olympic gold medalists Forrest Towns and Gwen Torrence as well as bronze medalist Debbie Ferguson.

Club sports

The University of Georgia offers a number of non-varsity sports such as ultimate frisbee, fencing, rugby, lacrosse, women's tennis and ice hockey. Club sports are administered by the university's Department of Recreational Sports. Teams frequently play intercollegiate rivals and join club sports conferences, such as the South Eastern Collegiate Hockey Conference.

Rugby
Founded in 1967, the University of Georgia Rugby Football Club plays Division 1 college rugby in the Southeastern Collegiate Rugby Conference against its traditional SEC rivals. Georgia finished the 2012 regular season with a 4–2 conference record, just missing the conference playoffs. The Bulldogs are led by head coach Doug Porter.

The UGA Rugby Club won the 1979 Savannah St. Patrick's Day Rugby Tournament.

Championships

NCAA and other collegiate team championships
Georgia has won 48 team national championships. The Bulldogs earned 31 NCAA championships at the Division I level.

Men's (10)
Baseball (1): 1990
Golf (2): 1999, 2005
Tennis (6): 1985, 1987, 1999, 2001, 2007, 2008
Outdoor Track & Field (1): 2018
Women's (21)
Golf (1): 2001
Gymnastics (10): 1987, 1989, 1993, 1998, 1999, 2005, 2006, 2007, 2008, 2009
Swimming (7): 1999, 2000, 2001, 2005, 2013, 2014, 2016
Tennis (2): 1994, 2000
Indoor Track & Field (1): 2018

Below are 17 national team titles in varsity sports that were not bestowed by the NCAA.
Men's (6)
Football (4): 1942, 1980, 2021, 2022
Indoor Tennis (2): 2006, 2007
Women's (11)
Indoor Tennis (4): 1994, 1995, 2002, 2019
Equestrian (7): 2003, 2004, 2008, 2009, 2010, 2014, 2021

Note: Georgia's website has multiple pages which list national championships by sport; before the 2021 football title victory, it only called out two seasons for football (1942 and 1980). Pre-2022 Georgia football media guides contain a year-by-year results section in which five seasons (1927, 1942, 1946, 1968, 1980) have "National Champions#" headers paired with selector callouts, but also a "Championship History" page which pairs 1942 and 1980 into a "The Consensus National Champions" section and groups 1927, 1946, and 1968 together as national champions without description, beyond identification of those specific selectors.

SEC Team Championships
Georgia has won 174 SEC team championships.

Men's (96)
Football (14): 1942, 1946, 1948, 1959, 1966, 1968, 1976, 1980, 1981, 1982, 2002, 2005, 2017, 2022
Baseball (6): 1933, 1953, 1954, 2001, 2004°, 2008
Basketball (3): 1983t, 1990, 2008t
Golf (29): 1941, 1950, 1951, 1952, 1957, 1958, 1959, 1961, 1962, 1963, 1964, 1965, 1969, 1970, 1971, 1972, 1977, 1978, 1982, 1983, 1988, 1998, 2000, 2001, 2004, 2006, 2009, 2010, 2016
Tennis (41): 1971, 1972, 1973, 1974, 1975, 1977, 1978, 1979, 1981, 1982, 1985, 1987, 1988, 1989, 1991, 1991t, 1993, 1993t, 1995, 1995t, 1996, 1997, 1999°, 2001, 2001t, 2002, 2004t, 2006, 2006t, 2007, 2007t, 2008, 2011°, 2012t, 2013, 2013t, 2014, 2015, 2016, 2017°, 2017t
Outdoor Track & Field (1): 1937
Swimming (3): 1951, 1952, 1955
Women's (76)
Basketball (8): 1983, 1984, 1986, 1991, 1996, 1997, 2000°, 2001t
Equestrian (3): 2015, 2017, 2018
Golf (11): 1983, 1985, 1988, 1990, 1993, 1994, 1997, 1998, 1999, 2001, 2007
Gymnastics (16): 1986, 1987, 1991, 1992, 1993, 1994, 1996, 1997, 1998, 1999, 2001, 2002, 2004, 2005, 2006, 2008
Softball (4): 2003, 2005, 2014, 2014t
Swimming (12): 1997, 1998, 1999, 2000, 2001, 2006, 2010, 2011, 2012, 2013, 2014, 2015
Tennis (18): 1983, 1983t, 1989, 1990, 1994, 1994t, 2000, 2001t, 2002, 2007, 2007t, 2008t, 2009, 2009t, 2013, 2014t, 2019,2021
Indoor Track & Field (1): 2006
Outdoor Track & Field (2): 1995, 2006
Volleyball (2): 1985, 1986

° = co-champions, t = tournament

Athletic directors
The athletic department suffered through several controversies in the early 2000s, including a major scandal within the men's basketball program. In 2003, a power struggle between University President Michael Adams and athletic director and Bulldog legend Vince Dooley stole headlines when Adams refused to renew Dooley's contract, effectively firing him. The battle became one painted as academics versus athletics, though this idea was rejected when the University's Franklin College of Arts and Sciences faculty issued a vote of "no confidence" on Adams' leadership in 2004.

The firestorm has calmed slightly since then, however, largely due to the success of Dooley's successor, Damon Evans. In 2006, the Bulldogs recorded the highest profit margin of any athletic program in the country (according to the EADA report), pulling in $23.9 million, and also recorded another highly successful year on the field. However, Evans was arrested for DUI on June 30, 2010; his passenger, a 28-year-old woman, was arrested for disorderly conduct who told police that she had been seeing Evans for about one week. Evans has been asked for his resignation effective on Monday, July 5, 2010 and he has agreed to resign.

Damon Evans was replaced by Greg McGarity, a Georgia alum and Associate AD at the University of Florida, in 2010. McGarity's tenure as Georgia's AD was one that saw a great surge in fundraising prowess, but much of that money was put away into what fans would derisively call, "The Rainy Day Fund," a reserve fund of money that would grow to $100M that McGarity would not spend on improving facilities in a manner fans believed he should, as other Athletics Associations in the SEC, such as the Alabama Crimson Tide, were doing. This refusal to improve Georgia's football facilities in particular would derisively become known as, "The Georgia Way," among disappointed fans who saw their football team fall behind Nick Saban's Crimson Tide in every conceivable way. McGarity oversaw the eventual firing of Georgia coaches in the three most important so-called "money sports": Dave Perno, Mark Richt, and Mark Fox, and in the instance of Perno and Fox, McGarity replaced them with coaches who have underperformed compared to the previous coach. He would also have to hire a replacement for Georgia Gymnastics legend Suzanne Yoculan during his time as AD, only to fire his first replacement and his second hire also fairing poorly. In replacing Richt, McGarity originally looked to hire Dan Mullen, who he knew from his time at Florida, but was eventually overruled by influential boosters who wanted Kirby Smart. As can be seen by the majority of McGarity's coaching hires, most of whom have fared poorly, hiring Mullen would have been a mistake as Smart is the most recent coach to win the College Football Playoff National Championship, the first Georgia Football National Title in 41 years, and Mullen was recently fired as the head coach at Florida. Kirby Smart came to Georgia from the successful Alabama football program, and did so with a list of demands for facilities improvements and a recruiting apparatus and budgetary overhaul that McGarity was not willing to provide Richt, but was happy to provide now for Smart.

Greg McGarity was replaced in the summer of 2021 by Josh Brooks, who is the Athletic Director of record for the Bulldogs' 2022 College Football Playoff National Championship win. McGarity left Brooks many Georgia Athletics teams in trouble due to his many poor coaching hires, with the 2021–22 Georgia Bulldogs Basketball Team playing historically badly.

Notable alumni
The Georgia Bulldogs football team boasts two Heisman Trophy winners (Frank Sinkwich, 1942, and Herschel Walker, 1982), and holds the distinction of having three graduates become Super Bowl MVPs (Jake Scott, 1972, Terrell Davis, 1998, and Hines Ward, 2005). Notable former players include RB Herschel Walker, WR Lindsay Scott, QB Eric Zeier, QB Fran Tarkenton, RB Frank Sinkwich, RB Charley Trippi, RB Rodney Hampton, FB Mack Strong, RB Garrison Hearst, DE Bill Stanfill, DB Terry Hoage, CB Champ Bailey, RB Terrell Davis, RB Olandis Gary, WR Hines Ward, DE Richard Seymour, LB Boss Bailey, DE/LB David Pollack, QB David Greene, K Kevin Butler, CB Sean Jones, SS/LB Thomas Davis, WR Reggie Brown, FS Greg Blue, QB Buck Belue, RB Knowshon Moreno, QB Matthew Stafford, and WR Mohamed Massaquoi, QB Evan Boose, PR Prince Miller, R Rennie Curran, LT Jon Stinchcomb, WR A. J. Green, RB Todd Gurley, RB Nick Chubb and LB Richard Tardits, the first Frenchman to play in the NFL.

The Lady Dogs basketball team has produced two U.S. Olympians who have combined to earn six Gold Medals (Teresa Edwards and Katrina McClain Johnson), 16 former players who have continued to the WNBA (second-most nationally), and six WNBA first-round draft picks in the past five years (second-most nationally). There were eight Lady Bulldogs on WNBA rosters in 2006: Kara Braxton, Detroit Shock; Kedra Holland-Corn, Detroit Shock; Deanna Nolan, Detroit Shock; Kelly Miller, Phoenix Mercury; Coco Miller, Washington Mystics; Christi Thomas, Los Angeles Sparks; Sherill Baker, New York Liberty; and Kiesha Brown, New York Liberty.

The Bulldogs baseball team has seen several of its former players move on to successful professional careers, most notably former New York Yankees pitcher Spud Chandler. Also, St. Louis Cardinals pitcher Cris Carpenter (not to be confused with current Cardinals pitcher Chris Carpenter), pitcher Derek Lilliquist, Chicago White Sox batter Gordon Beckham, Seattle Mariners pitcher Dave Fleming, and Georgia high school football coaching legend Billy Henderson played for the Bulldogs.

References

External links

 
Sports in Athens, Georgia